is a name for a social group in Japan.

During Japan's feudal era, these occupations acquired a hereditary status of untouchability, and became an unofficial caste of the Tokugawa class system during the Edo period. Due to severe discrimination and ostracism in Japanese society, these groups came to live as outcasts, in their own separate villages or ghettos. After the caste system was abolished, the term  came into use to refer the former caste members and their descendants, who continued to experience stigmatization and discrimination.

Terminology 
In the regions of Japan where the  issue is much less publically prominent, such as Hokkaido and Okinawa,  is still used in a non-pejorative sense to refer to any hamlet. Historically, the term  was used for an outcast community that was discriminated against officially and formally.

During the feudal era, the outcaste were termed , a term now considered derogatory.  towns were termed .

Definition 
Because of this, there is an increasingly large population that has no idea that others would consider them . Discrimination is primarily based on ancestry and location; someone with no  ancestry may be viewed as one and discriminated against if they move to a former .

Historical origins 
Initially, they dealt with pollution but were not considered defiled personally. From the Heian period through medieval period,  were regarded as having the ability to cleanse ritual pollution, and in some portrayals were even considered as having magical powers.  were associated with the tanning industry and had the exclusive rights to tan hides.

, meaning 'non-human', was another pre- status, applying to beggars and camp followers of samurai. Their position was more mobile and they were thought to be less polluted. They had to work as restroom attendants, prison officers, or executioners.

End of the feudal era 

The feudal caste system in Japan ended formally in 1869 with the Meiji restoration. In 1871, the newly formed Meiji government issued the  decree, giving outcasts equal legal status. However,  were deprived of the exclusive rights of disposal of dead bodies of horses and cattle. The elimination of their monopolies of certain occupations actually resulted in a decrease of their general living standards, while social discrimination simply continued.

During the early Meiji era, many anti- riots happened around the country. For example, in a village in Okayama when "former " tried to buy alcohol, four men were killed, four men were injured and 25 houses were destroyed by commoners.

The practice of eating meat existed even during the Edo period. but the official ban of the consumption of meat from livestock was ended in 1871 in order to "Westernise" the country. Many former  began to work in abattoirs and as butchers, as they were thought to be experienced with the handling of dead bodies.

Slow-changing social attitudes, especially in the countryside, meant that abattoirs and their workers were often met with hostility from local residents. Continued ostracism as well as the decrease of living standards resulted in former  communities becoming slum areas. Prejudice against the consumption of meat continued throughout the Meiji period. They claimed that gods would leave Japan because the Japanese had eaten meat.

There were many terms used to indicate former outcastes, their communities or settlements at the time.

The term , now considered inappropriate, started being used by officials during the 1900s, and resulted in the meaning of the word  ('hamlet') coming to imply former  villages in certain parts of Japan.

Attempts to resolve the problem during the early 20th century were of two types: the  philosophy which encouraged improvements in living standards of  communities and integration with the mainstream Japanese society, and the  philosophy which concentrated on confronting and criticising alleged perpetrators of discrimination.

Post-war situation 
Although liberated legally during 1871 with the abolition of the feudal caste system, this did not end social discrimination against  nor improve their living standards; until recently, Japanese family registration was fixed to an ancestral home address, which allowed people to deduce their  ancestry.

Demographics 
The number of  asserted to be living in modern Japan varies from source to source. A 1993 report by the Japanese government counted 4,533  throughout the country. Most were located in western Japan, while none were located in Hokkaido and Tōhoku. About three quarters of the districts are in rural areas. The size of each community ranged from less than five households to more than 1,000 households. 

The Buraku Liberation League (BLL) has extrapolated Meiji-era figures to arrive at an estimate of nearly three million .

In some areas,  are in a majority; per a 1997 report, they accounted for more than 70 percent of all residents of Yoshikawa (now Kōnan) in Kōchi Prefecture. In Ōtō, Fukuoka Prefecture, they accounted for more than 60 percent. Japanese government statistics show the number of residents of assimilation districts who claim  ancestry, whereas BLL figures are estimates of the total number of descendants of all former and current  residents, including current residents without any  ancestry.

Discrimination in access to services 
While in many parts of the country  settlements, built on the site of former  villages, ceased to exist by the 1960s because of either urban development or integration into mainstream society, in other regions many of their residents continued to suffer from slum-like housing and infrastructure, lower economic status, illiteracy, and lower general educational standards.

Communities deemed to be in need of funding were designated for various , such as construction of new housing and community facilities such as health centers, libraries and swimming pools. The projects were terminated in 2002 with a total funding of an estimated 12 trillion yen over 33 years.

Social discrimination 
Cases of social discrimination against residents of  areas are still an issue in certain regions. Outside of the Kansai region, people in general are often not aware of the issues experienced by those of  ancestry, and if they are, this awareness may only be awareness of the history of feudal Japan. Due to the sensitive nature of the topic and the campaigns by the Buraku Liberation League to remove any references in the media that may propagate discrimination against them, the issue is rarely discussed in the media.

Prejudice against  most often manifests itself in the form of marriage discrimination and sometimes in employment. Traditionalist families have been known to check on the backgrounds of potential in-laws to identify people of  ancestry. These checks are now illegal, and marriage discrimination is diminishing; Nadamoto Masahisa of the Buraku History Institute estimates that between 60 and 80% of  marry a non-, whereas for people born during the late 1930s and early 1940s, the rate was 10%.

The average income of a  family was significantly less than the national average (60% in 1992).

Cases of continuing social discrimination are known to occur mainly in western Japan, particularly in the Osaka, Kyoto, Hyogo, and Hiroshima regions, where many people, especially the older generation, stereotype  residents (whatever their ancestry) and associate them with squalor, unemployment and criminality.

No  communities were identified in the following prefectures: Hokkaido, Aomori, Iwate, Miyagi, Akita, Yamagata, Fukushima, Tokyo, Toyama, Ishikawa, and Okinawa.

Yakuza membership 
According to David E. Kaplan and Alec Dubro in Yakuza: The Explosive Account of Japan's Criminal Underworld (1986),  account for about 70% of the members of Yamaguchi-gumi, the largest yakuza crime syndicate in Japan.

Mitsuhiro Suganuma, an ex-member of the Public Security Intelligence Agency, testified in 2006 that  account for about 60 percent of the members of the entire yakuza.

incident 
In November 1975, the Osaka part of the  Liberation League was alerted about the existence of a book named . Investigations revealed that copies of the hand-written 330-page book were being sold secretly by an Osaka-based business to numerous businesses and individuals throughout Japan by a mail order service named Cablenet, at between ¥5,000 and ¥50,000 per copy. 

The book contained a nationwide list of all the names and locations of  settlements, as well as the primary means of employment of their inhabitants, which could be compared against people's addresses to determine if they were  residents. The preface contained the following message: "At this time, we have decided to go against public opinion and create this book [for] personnel managers grappling with employment issues, and families pained by problems with their children's marriages".

More than 200 large Japanese companies, including, according to the  Liberation and Human Rights Research Institute of Osaka, Toyota, Nissan, Honda and Daihatsu, along with thousands of individuals purchased copies of the book. In 1985, partially in response to the popularity of this book, and an increase of  the Osaka prefectural government introduced "An Ordinance to Regulate Personal Background Investigation Conducive to  Discrimination".

Although the production and sale of the book has been banned, numerous copies of it are still in existence, and in 1997, an Osaka private investigation company was the first to be charged with violation of the 1985 statute for using the text.

Nonaka incident 

In 2001, future Prime Minister of Japan Tarō Asō, along with Hiromu Nonaka, was among the LDP's chief candidates to succeed Yoshirō Mori as premier of Japan. Nonaka, the former Chief Cabinet Secretary, is of  descent. During a meeting of LDP officials at which Nonaka was not present, Asō reportedly told the assembled group, "We are not going to let someone from the  become the prime minister, are we?". 

Nonaka subsequently withdrew as a candidate. Asō's comment about Nonaka's heritage was revealed in 2005. Asō denied that he had made the statement, but Hisaoki Kamei, who was present at the 2001 meeting, stated in January 2009 that he had heard Asō say something "to that effect".

Hashimoto incident 
In 2012, Tōru Hashimoto, a lawyer, former governor of Osaka Prefecture, former mayor of Ōsaka City and the founder of the political party Nippon Ishin no Kai, was the subject of an article published in the magazine , entitled , which claimed his father to be  and his relatives members of the yakuza. The article further elaborated that Hashimoto was eccentric and dangerous based on his "blood".

Hashimoto, who was the mayor of Ōsaka at that time, excluded the newspaper The Asahi Shimbun, the wholly-owned subsidiary company of the magazine's publisher, from a press conference and demanded an explanation from the publisher. Hashimoto later sued the publisher and the writer  for defamation. The Buraku Liberation League, who did not endorse his policies, also remonstrated. The publisher had a third party examine the incident and apologized. The president of the publisher, resigned to take responsibility.

rights movement 
The declaration portrayed the  ancestors as "manly martyrs of industry" and argued that to submit meekly to oppression would be to insult and profane these ancestors.

After World War II, the National Committee for Burakumin Liberation was initiated, changing its name to the  during the 1950s. The league, with the endorsement of the socialist and communist parties, influenced the government into making important concessions during the late 1960s and 1970s.

During the 1960s, the Sayama Incident publicised the problems of the group. The incident involved the murder conviction of a member of the discriminated communities based on circumstantial evidence, which is generally given little weight vs. physical evidence in Japanese courts.

One concession was the passing of the Special Measures Law for Assimilation Projects, which provided financial aid for the discriminated communities. In 1976, legislation was also approved banning third parties from investigating another person's family registry. This traditional system of registry, kept for all Japanese by the Ministry of Justice since the 19th century, would reveal an individual's  ancestry if consulted. By the new legislation, these records could now be consulted only for legal cases, making it more difficult to identify or discriminate against members of the group.

During the 1980s, some educators and local governments, particularly in areas with relatively large  populations, began special education programs which they hoped would encourage greater educational and economic success for young members of the group and decrease the discrimination they faced.  rights groups exist presently in all parts of Japan except for Hokkaidō and Okinawa.

 have been established across the country by prefectural governments and local authorities; these, in addition to promoting  rights, campaign on behalf of a wide range of other groups such as women, the disabled, ethnic minorities, foreign residents and released prisoners. Even into the early 1990s, however, discussion of the 'liberation' of these discriminated communities, or even their existence, was rare in public discussion.

Liberation League and the  
The Buraku Liberation League is considered one of the most militant among 's rights groups. The BLL is known for its fierce "denunciation and explanation sessions", where alleged perpetrators of discriminatory actions or speech are summoned for a public hearing before a panel of activists.

Early sessions were marked by occasions of violence and kidnapping, and several BLL activists have been arrested for such acts. The legality of these sessions is still disputed, but to this date the authorities have mostly ignored them except in the more extreme cases.

In 1990, Karel van Wolferen's criticism of the BLL in his much-acclaimed book The Enigma of Japanese Power prompted the BLL to demand the publisher halt publication of the Japanese translation of the book. Van Wolferen condemned this as an international scandal.

It was formed in 1979 by BLL activists who were either purged from the organization or abandoned it during the late 1960s, due to, among other things, their opposition to the decision that subsidies to the  should be limited to the BLL members only. Not all  were BLL members, and not all residents of the areas targeted for subsidies were historically descended from the out-caste.

The  often disputed the BLL, accusing them of chauvinism. The conflict between the two organizations increased during 1974 when a clash between teachers belonging to a JCP-affiliated union and BLL activists at a high school in Yoka, rural Hyōgo Prefecture, put 29 in hospital.

In 1988, the BLL formed the International Movement Against All Forms of Discrimination and Racism (IMADR). The BLL sought for the IMADR to be recognized as a United Nations Non-Government Organization, but in 1991, the  informed the United Nations about the alleged human rights violations committed by the BLL in the course of their "denunciation sessions" held with accused "discriminators".

According to a BLL-funded think tank, when cases of discrimination were alleged, the  often conducted denunciation sessions as fierce as those of the BLL. Nonetheless, the IMADR was designated a UN human rights NGO in March 1993.

On March 3, 2004, the  announced that "the  issue has basically been resolved" and formally disbanded.

Discrimination from Buddhists 

Jōdo Shinshū Buddhism originally patronized the lower castes. The effect of this encouragement, however, was that it resulted in a series of anti-feudal rebellions, known as the Ikkō-ikki revolts, which seriously threatened the religious and political status-quo. Accordingly, the political powers created a situation whereby the Jōdo Shinshū divided into two competing parts, the Shinshu Otani-ha and the Honganji-ha. This had the consequence that the sects became less anti-feudal.

The Honganji, which during Rennyo's leadership of it had defiantly accepted the derogatory label of "the dirty sect" (see Rennyo's letters known as the ) now began to discriminate against its own  members as it jostled for political and social status.

In 1922, when the National Levelers' Association was initiated in Kyoto, Mankichi Saiko, a founder of the society and Jodo Shinshu priest, said:

After many petitions from the BLL, in 1969 the Honganji changed its opinion on the  issue. , which disassociated from the BLL in 1968, regrets this decision.

For example, in 1979 the Director-General of the Sōtō Sect of Buddhism made a speech at the "3rd World Conference on Religion and Peace" claiming that there was no discrimination against burakumin in Japan.

Notable  

 Tadashi Yanai, founder and president of Uniqlo
 Tōru Hashimoto, politician of the Nippon Ishin no Kai, lawyer, the 52nd governor of Osaka Prefecture, and former Mayor of Osaka city

 Jiichirō Matsumoto, politician and businessman who was called the " liberation father"
 Ryu Matsumoto, politician of the Minshutō Party of Japan, a member of the House of Representatives in the Diet (national legislature)
 Toru Matsuoka, politician of the Minshutō Party of Japan, a member of the House of Councillors in the Diet (national legislature)
 Rentarō Mikuni, actor
 Manabu Miyazaki, writer, social critic and public figure known for his underworld ties
 Kenji Nakagami, writer, critic, and poet
 Hiromu Nonaka, chief cabinet secretary (1998–1999)

See also 
 Buraku Liberation League
 Feudal Japan hierarchy

Discrimination in Japan 
 Racism in Japan
 Human rights in Japan

General 
 Caste
 Untouchability
 , the former outcast community of Korean society
 Dalit, a collective term for the outcast endogamous communities of India and Nepal
 Cagot or Agotes, the former outcast community of France and Spain
 , the outcast community of Vietnam after the Fall of Saigon

References

Bibliography 

Main text originally from Library of Congress, Country Studies. 'Religious Discrimination' and 'Jodo shinshu Honganji' sections adapted from Shindharmanet and BLHRRI.Org.

 Alldritt, Leslie D. The Burakumin: The Complicity of Japanese Buddhism in Oppression and an Opportunity for Liberation
 Amos, Timothy P. "Portrait of a Tokugawa Outcaste Community", East Asian History (2006) Issue 32/33, pp 83–108
 Amos, Timothy P. Embodying Difference: The Making of Burakumin in Modern Japan (2011)
 Amos, Timothy. "Fighting the Taboo Cycle: Google Map Protests and Buraku Human Rights Activism in Historical Perspective." Japanese Studies 35.3 (2015): 331–353.
 Amos, Timothy. "Binding Burakumin: Marxist historiography and the narration of difference in Japan." Japanese Studies 27.2 (2007): 155–171.
 Fowler, Edward. "The Buraku in Modern Japanese Literature: Texts and Contexts", Journal of Japanese Studies (2000) 26#1 pp 1–39
 Groemer, Gerald. "The Creation of the Edo Outcaste Order." Journal of Japanese Studies 2001 27#2 pp 263–293 in JSTOR
 Kasahara, Toshinori. Shin Buddhism and the Buraku-min (1996 Honolulu Higashi Honganji)
 Neary, Ian. "Burakumin in contemporary Japan", in Japan's Minorities: The Illusion of Homogeneity, Michael Weiner, ed.
 Neary. Ian. "Burakumin at the End of History", Social Research (2003) 70#1 pp 269–294, online.
 Shimazaki, Toson. The Broken Commandment
 Suzuki, D.T., Oiwa, K. The Japan We Never Knew: A Journey of Discovery (Stoddart Publishing, Toronto: 1996)

External links 
 The Headquarters of Buraku Liberation League
 The Buraku Liberation and Human Rights Research Institute
 The Burakumin: The Complicity of Japanese Buddhism in Oppression and an Opportunity for Liberation
 Cooperativeness and Buraku Discrimination, discussion paper by Takuya Ito in the electronic journal of contemporary Japanese studies, October 31, 2005.
 Solving Anti-Burakujūmin Prejudice in the 21st Century: Suggestions from 21 Buraku Residents, discussion paper by Alastair McLauchlan in the electronic journal of contemporary Japanese studies, January 31, 2003.
 Buraku: in Community, Democracy, and Performance by Bruce Caron
 ひょうご部落解放・人権研究所(Burakumin research institute)
 全国部落解放運動連合会(National Buraku Liberation Alliance)→全国地域人権運動総連合 (National Confederation of Human Rights Movements in the Community) → Zenkoku Jinken Ren Blog
 部落問題研究所 (Burakumin research institute)
 京都部落問題研究資料センター (Burakumin in Kyoto research data)
 自由同和会(Burakumin rights group)
 全日本同和会 (Burakumin rights group)
 部落解放同盟全国連合会 (Burakumin rights group)
 "Japan's Invisible Minority: Better Off Than in Past, but Still Outcasts". The New York Times, November 30, 1995. Nicholas Kristof on the state of toleration at that time.
 "Japan's Outcasts Still Wait for Acceptance". The New York Times, January 15, 2009. Article by Norimitsu Onishi on Buraku history and current status, with a focus on Hiromu Nonaka, a prominent politician of Buraku descent.
 Old Japanese maps on Google Earth unveil secrets  Sat May 2, 2009 - Jay Alabaster, Associated Press.
 "Mysterious Past Meets Uncertain Future in Tokyo's Sanya District". Digital Journal, October 31, 2009. Blair McBride on Buraku status of North-East Tokyo area.

 
 

 
Human rights abuses in Japan
Society of Japan
Demographics of Japan
Japanese caste system
Japanese values
Identity politics in Japan
Social history of Japan
Japan
Yakuza